Max Ian Stier (born c. 1966) is an American attorney who serves as the president and CEO of the Partnership for Public Service.

Early life and education 
Stier is the son of Serena Auster Stier and Herbert A. Stier. His mother is a mystery writer and adjunct assistant professor of law and art history at the University of Iowa; his father was an orthopedic surgeon in Los Angeles. He earned a Bachelor of Arts degree from Yale University and a Juris Doctor from Stanford Law School.

Career 
In 1982, he worked on the staff of Republican Congressman Jim Leach. In 1992, he clerked for Chief Judge James L. Oakes of the U.S. Court of Appeals for the Second Circuit. In 1994, he served as a clerk for Justice David Souter of the U.S. Supreme Court.

In 1995, Stier joined the Washington D.C. firm of Williams & Connolly where he was part of President Bill Clinton's defense team during the Clinton–Lewinsky scandal.

Stier was always concerned with the quality of government workers and was able to convince hedge fund manager Samuel Heyman to contribute $25 million to start up a non-for-profit dedicated to attracting qualified young people to government service, the Partnership for Public Service.

Personal life 
Stier has been married twice. In 2004, he was remarried to fellow Stanford University law student Florence Y. Pan at the New Zealand embassy in Washington, D.C., and the couple have two sons. In 2016, President Barack Obama nominated Pan to serve as a United States District Judge of the United States District Court for the District of Columbia. Her nomination expired in January 2017 with the end of the 114th Congress, but she was re-nominated June 15, 2021, by President Joe Biden.

See also 
 List of law clerks of the Supreme Court of the United States (Seat 3)

References

External links 

 

1966 births
20th-century American Jews
21st-century American lawyers
Living people
Stanford Law School alumni
Yale University alumni
Law clerks of the Supreme Court of the United States
21st-century American Jews
Williams & Connolly people